Serethor was a woman who lived in ancient Egypt during the First Dynasty.

Serethor was a wife of the King Den. She is known from a funerary stela in Umm El Qa'ab, which is now in the Musée du Louvre, but no titles have been preserved. She may have been buried in the funerary complex of Den.

References 

30th-century BC women
Queens consort of the First Dynasty of Egypt
Den (pharaoh)